Sumeet Samos is an Indian anti-caste scholar and rapper from Odisha, India. He writes and sings in English, Hindi and Odia. His first hip-hop single "Ladai Seekh Le" (Learn to Resist) was released in 2018.

Samos addresses SC/ST students, Savarna oppression, Ambedkar-Phule ideology, manual scavenging, caste discrimination and atrocities against Dalits in his songs.

Life
Sumeet Samos was born into a Dalit family of Tentulipadar village of Koraput district, Odisha. He completed his schooling from Bhubaneswar. He has a Masters in Latin American Literature (Spanish) from Jawaharlal Nehru University, where he joined the Birsa Ambedkar Phule Students' Association.

Samos started rapping in 2016 and his inspiration is the rapper Tupac Shakur.

Tracks

References

External links
 

1993 births
Living people
Singers from Odisha
Musicians from Odisha
21st-century Indian singers
Dalit activists